Eucompsa is a genus of horse flies in the family Tabanidae.

Species
Eucompsa aureocincta Enderlein, 1922
Eucompsa tecticallosa Schuurmans Stekhoven, 1932

References

Brachycera genera
Tabanidae
Diptera of Asia
Taxa named by Günther Enderlein